Charles Spencelayh (October 27, 1865 – June 25, 1958) was an English genre painter and portraitist in the Academic style.

Spencelayh was born in Rochester in Kent, and first studied at the National Art Training School, South Kensington. He showed his work at the Paris Salon, but most of his exhibitions were in Britain. Between 1892 and 1958, he exhibited more than 70 paintings at the Royal Academy, including  "Why War" (1939), which won the Royal Academy ‘Picture of the Year’. He had a solo exhibition at The Sunderland Art Gallery in 1936.

Spencelayh was a founder member of the Royal Society of Miniature Painters, where he exhibited 129 miniatures between 1896 and 1954.
 
Many of his subjects were of domestic scenes, painted with an almost photographic detail, such as "The Laughing Parson" (1935) and "His Daily Ration" (1946). He also painted still life subjects including "Exploration" (1931) and "Apples" (1951).
 
Spencelayh was a favourite of Queen Mary, who was an avid collector of his work. In 1924 he painted a miniature of King George V for the Queen's dolls house.

On 17 December 2009, Spencelayh's masterpiece "The Old Dealer" was sold at auction at Sotheby's for over £345,000.

An exhibition of Spencelayh's work was held from 31 January to 21 June 2015 at the Guildhall Museum, Rochester.


Selected works

The Old Dealer
 The Snodland Ferry * (Guildhall Museum, Rochester, Kent)
 Time on his Hands
Here's to Victory
Winning the War (1945)
Dig for Victory 
Mothers Sampler
Overdrawn at the Bank
The Promised Land
That damned Cat
The Cause of all the Trouble                                                                                                                                                                     
The Slump
Old Gold
Good Tonic
Great Hopes (1944)
Another Loss
Dreams of Glory
Annie Laurie
Fresh Today 
The Bloom of the Season
We will remember Them (1943)
Early Victorian
An Odd Lot

References

Further reading
 Aubrey Noakes. Spencelayh (Chaucer Press, 2005).

External links

 Spencelayh's Cats
Spencelayh online (ArtCyclopedia)
paintings by Spencelayh (Art Renewal Center Museum)
paintings by Spencelayh (Bridgemand Art Library)
Biography of Spencelayh (Richard Green Fine Paintings)
A lover of Dickens (Watercolour - Christie's)

1865 births
1958 deaths
19th-century English painters
English male painters
20th-century English painters
British genre painters
English portrait painters
People from Rochester, Kent
19th-century English male artists
20th-century English male artists